The Rovers Cup was an annual football tournament held in India, organized by the Western India Football Association. It was the second oldest tournament in India after Durand Cup.

History

Rovers Cup was incorporated by some British football enthusiasts in Bombay, Bombay Presidency, in 1890, as a form of amusement. After the foundation of Bombay Football Association (BFA) in 1902, the tournament became well organized. Patronised by Justice Russell, the tournament was firstly opened to British teams. Later in 1911, Western India Football Association was founded as a result of merger between BFA and Rovers Cup Committee. After justice Russel became president and P. R. Cadell became vice-president of WIFA, Indian clubs were given opportunity to participate, and Bengal United (a squad formed with Indian soldiers serving in British battalions) became first Indian team to compete. The tournament was suspended from 1914 to 1920 due to the World War I. Some legendary players from Great Britain, including Arsenal winger Denis Compton, Scottish international Tommy Walker and English international Bobby Langton appeared in the tournament in mid-20th century with visiting overseas teams.

The First Worcester Regiment became first team to clinch the title. Mohun Bagan became the first non-army civilian club in the tournament to compete in 1923 and achieved runners-up position, after their 4–1 defeat to Durham Light Infantry. Mohammedan Sporting from Calcutta became the first Indian club to win title, when they defeated Bangalore Muslims 1–0 in 1940. Mohammedan later won 1956, 1959, 1980, 1984 and 1987 editions. In the 1950s, Syed Abdul Rahim managed Hyderabad City Police formed their supremacy, winning Rovers Cup consecutively from 1950 to 1954. In modern era, Iraqi club Salahaddin became the first foreign side to win trophy, when they defeated Mohammedan Sporting 2–1 in 1982. In 1958, Caltex Sports Club had the honor of becoming the first local team to win it, and Bengal Mumbai is the last local team to win title. The championship was last time held in the 2000–01 season, when Mohun Bagan beat Churchill Brothers by 2–0 in the final.

After the inception of the National Football League, the Rovers Cup started facing problems. With huge costs and sponsorship deals issues, the tournament was finally dissolved in 2001. In 2007, the WIFA announced that they were making attempts to revive the tournament.

Venue
The primary venue of the tournament was Cooperage Ground in Bombay (now Mumbai). The stadium, built over hundred years ago, hosted each and every edition of the tournament.

Results

Pre-independence era (1890–1947)

Post-independence era (1948–2001)

Notes:
1. The tournament was abandoned when the stands collapsed during the quarterfinal between Mohun Bagan and 1st Bn, South Staffordshire Regiment
2. Joint winners after replay
3. Joint winners after replay
4. Replay after first match was abandoned at 84', with the score at 0–1, as Dempo refused to continue after having a goal disallowed
5. Joint winners
6. Penalty shootout

Performance by teams

Performance by Indian teams
During its initial years, only British teams contested in the tournament. Mohun Bagan AC was the first Indian team to participate in this tournament on invitation in 1923, but they lost in the finals to Durham Light Infantry by 14 margin. The first Indian team to win this tournament was Bangalore Muslims, in 1937.

Statistics: Teams with at least 2 wins, (including joint wins)

Performance by overseas teams
Overseas teams had often been invited to participate in Rovers Cup.

Winners
 Salahaddin FC (1982)
 Al-Jaish Army SC (1983)
 Oman Club (1995)

Runners-up
  Kemari Union FC (1954)

See also

list of oldest football competitions
 Football in India
 IFA Shield
 Federation Cup
 Super Cup

References

Further reading

Dutta, P. L., Memoir of 'Father of Indian Football' Nagendraprasad Sarbadhikary (Calcutta: N. P. Sarbadhikary Memorial Committee, 1944) (hereafter Memoir)

Ghosh, Saurindra Kumar. Krira Samrat Nagendraprasad Sarbadhikary 1869–1940 (Calcutta: N. P. Sarbadhikary Memorial Committee, 1963) (hereafter Krira Samrat).

 
 
From recreation to competition: Early history of Indian football . pp. 124–141. Published online: 6 Aug 2006. www.tandfonline.com. Retrieved 30 June 2021.

External links
India – List of Rovers Cup Finals at RSSSF

Football cup competitions in India
Football in Mumbai
1890 establishments in India
2001 disestablishments in India
Defunct football competitions in India
Defunct international association football competitions in Asia